The Little Neva or Malaya Neva is the second largest distributary of the river Neva. The Neva splits into Great Neva (the southern armlet) and Little Neva (the northern armlet) near the Spit of Vasilievsky Island (easternmost tip of the island), in the historic centre of the city of Saint Petersburg.

It has its own armlets: Smolenka and Zhdanovka. There are three bridges across Little Neva: Exchange Bridge, Tuchkov Bridge and Betancourt Bridge.

See also
 List of bridges in Saint Petersburg

References

Rivers of Saint Petersburg
Distributaries of the Neva